José Luis Cruz Jr. (born April 19, 1974), is a Puerto Rican baseball coach and former outfielder, who is the current head baseball coach for the Rice Owls. He played college baseball at Rice University from 1992 to 1995 and played in Major League Baseball (MLB) for 12 seasons from 1997 to 2008. In 2021, he returned to his alma mater, Rice.

Cruz was born in Arroyo, Puerto Rico. His father José Cruz was a baseball player and coach, and the family lived in Texas. He attended high school in Bellaire, Texas, when his father was a member of the Houston Astros. After graduation from Bellaire, Cruz enrolled at Rice University and played baseball for the Owls, starting for four seasons.

The Seattle Mariners selected Cruz in the first round of the 1995 Major League Baseball draft. He played 12 years as an outfielder in the MLB, with Seattle in 1997, the Toronto Blue Jays from 1997 to 2002, the San Francisco Giants in 2003, the Tampa Bay Devil Rays in 2004, the Arizona Diamondbacks in 2005, the Boston Red Sox in 2005, the Los Angeles Dodgers from 2005 to 2006, the San Diego Padres in 2007 and the Houston Astros in 2008.

In 2021, Cruz was named the assistant hitting coach of the Detroit Tigers, but he left the position on June 12 to accept the head coaching job at Rice University. He is the son of former major league outfielder and Houston Astros first base coach José Cruz, and the nephew of former big leaguers Héctor and Tommy Cruz.

Biography
Cruz grew up in Bellaire, Texas and attended Bellaire High School where he played baseball.

He was also a three time All-American while at Rice, setting virtually all possible offensive records.

Cruz was a first round pick, 3rd overall, for the Seattle Mariners in the 1995 amateur draft and began his major league career on May 31, . He was not in Seattle very long and was traded to the Toronto Blue Jays for Paul Spoljaric and Mike Timlin on July 31, 1997. As of the 2019 season, Cruz holds record for most home runs in the first season of a career having played for two or more clubs. He stayed in Toronto until  and twice hit at least 30 home runs with the Blue Jays. He was signed as a free agent by the San Francisco Giants on January 28, 2003. In San Francisco, he won a Gold Glove and broke Willie Mays' franchise single-season record for outfield assists with 19. In , Cruz Jr. played for three teams, the Arizona Diamondbacks, Boston Red Sox and finally the Los Angeles Dodgers. Although injured most of the year, Cruz ended the season on a tear, hitting .301 with six homers as a Dodger.

Cruz was picked to play for Puerto Rico in the  World Baseball Classic. In the tournament, Cruz hit .353 with a .476 on-base percentage in five games helping Puerto Rico reach the second round.

The Dodgers designated Cruz for assignment on August 1, 2006, and eventually released him. Cruz later signed a contract with the San Diego Padres and played for them for a portion of the  season. Cruz was placed on unconditional release waivers by the Padres on August 1, 2007. On August 18, 2007, the New York Yankees signed him to a minor league deal.

On November 28, 2007, he signed a minor league deal with the Houston Astros. At the end of the  spring training, he was added to the 40-man roster. He was later designated for assignment.

Cruz has worked as a Major League Baseball analyst for ESPN (Baseball Tonight) and MLB.com.

Cruz said that he moved from Bellaire after being arrested by Bellaire police for a missing front license plate on a newly purchased car and spending one night in jail in 2002. Cruz accused the police of racial profiling.

On December 8, 2020, Cruz was named assistant hitting coach for the Detroit Tigers.

On June 9, 2021, Cruz was hired as the head coach of the Rice Owls.

Head coaching record

Personal life
Cruz's son Trei Cruz was drafted in the third round, 73rd overall, by the Detroit Tigers in the 2020 MLB draft.

Awards
Toronto Blue Jays team MVP in 2001.

Cruz won the NL Gold Glove in 2003 as a member of the Giants.

See also
 List of Major League Baseball players from Puerto Rico
 List of second-generation Major League Baseball players
 30–30 club

References

External links

1974 births
Living people
All-American college baseball players
Arizona Diamondbacks players
Boston Red Sox players
Detroit Tigers coaches
Everett AquaSox players
Gold Glove Award winners
Houston Astros players
Lancaster JetHawks players
Los Angeles Dodgers players
Major League Baseball outfielders
Major League Baseball players from Puerto Rico
People from Arroyo, Puerto Rico
People from Bellaire, Texas
Port City Roosters players
Puerto Rican expatriate baseball players in Canada
Rice Owls baseball coaches
Rice Owls baseball players
Riverside Pilots players
San Diego Padres players
San Francisco Giants players
Scranton/Wilkes-Barre Yankees players
Seattle Mariners players
Sportspeople from Harris County, Texas
Syracuse SkyChiefs players
Tacoma Rainiers players
Tampa Bay Devil Rays players
Toronto Blue Jays players
Tucson Sidewinders players
2006 World Baseball Classic players
Alaska Goldpanners of Fairbanks players